Shaun Terrance McDonald (born June 30, 1981) is a former American football wide receiver. He was drafted by the St. Louis Rams in the fourth round of the 2003 NFL Draft. He played college football at Arizona State.

McDonald has also played for the Detroit Lions and Pittsburgh Steelers.

Early years
McDonald is a 1999 graduate of Shadow Mountain High School in Phoenix and was a 1999 Honorable Mention All-America by USA Today. He also earned All-state honors as a kick return specialist and all-conference as a wide receiver and kick specialist as a junior. He was a three-year starter and had five kickoff returns for touchdowns as a senior before missing one-third of his senior season with a broken fibula. As a senior, he had 800 yards receiving (30 yard average), 1,700 all-purpose yards, added seven kick returns for touchdown, and averaged 46 yards per kick return. As a junior, he returned four kickoffs of 90 yards or longer for touchdowns. He still holds the state record for most kickoff returns for touchdowns with 14. He lettered three times in football and four times each in soccer and track and field. McDonald also scored a goal and assisted on another in winning the state championship in soccer.

College career

McDonald played his college football at Arizona State University. McDonald will go down as one of the most prolific pass catchers in Arizona State history. He came to Arizona State in 2000 after a standout prep career in Phoenix. McDonald broke out in 2001 after a quiet freshman season, catching 47 passes for 1,104 yards and 10 touchdowns, earning him All Pac-10 honors.

McDonald followed up his impressive 2001 with an even better 2002, when he caught 87 passes for 1,405 yards and 13 touchdowns. McDonald ranked 6th nationally in receiving yards in 2002 and he was tied for third nationally in receiving touchdowns.

McDonald was a Biletnikoff Award (best receiver) finalist in 2002 and a third-team All-American selection in his junior season. He currently holds Sun Devil single-season records in receptions and receiving yards. McDonald declared for the NFL Draft after his junior season.

Professional career

Pre-draft
McDonald measured 5'9" and 174 pounds and ran a 4.34 40-yard dash at his ASU pro day.

St Louis Rams
The St Louis Rams made McDonald the 106th pick in the 2003 NFL Draft. At the end of the 2006 season, McDonald finished his career with the Rams with 106 catches for 1,215 yards and four touchdowns.

Detroit Lions
In the 2007 offseason, McDonald left the Rams and joined former Rams offensive coordinator Mike Martz with the Detroit Lions. That season, McDonald led the Lions in catches with 79, 943 yards, and touchdowns with six.

In 2008, McDonald started seven of the 12 games in which he played and caught 35 passes for 332 yards and a touchdown.

Pittsburgh Steelers
McDonald was signed by the Pittsburgh Steelers on May 1, 2009.

NFL career statistics

Personal life
McDonald has two cousins in professional sports - former NBA point guard Mike Bibby and professional soccer player Robbie Findley. He is also related through marriage to Eddie House who most recently played for the Miami Heat.

External links
Detroit Lions bio
Pittsburgh Steelers bio

1981 births
Living people
Players of American football from Phoenix, Arizona
American football wide receivers
American football return specialists
Arizona State Sun Devils football players
St. Louis Rams players
Detroit Lions players
Pittsburgh Steelers players